The West Peruvian dove or Pacific dove (Zenaida meloda) is a species of dove in the genus Zenaida.

Description
The West Peruvian dove has prominent white bands on its wings and wide tails corners, also white. Its eyes have violet-blue rings.

Distribution and habitat
Z. meloda can be found in desert lowlands and foothills in many open and semi-open habitats. These include streets, gardens, farms, and palm oases.

Gallery

References

West Peruvian dove
Birds of Chile
Birds of Ecuador
Birds of Peru
Western South American coastal birds
West Peruvian dove